Parteen is a village in County Clare, Ireland. It is situated in the townland of the same name that is part of the civil parish of St Patrick's. It is also part of an Ecclesiastical parish of "Parteen-Meelick" in the Roman Catholic Diocese of Limerick. The village has a large church (St Patrick's), three public houses, a national school and one shop. It is within sight of the Ardnacrusha hydro-electric power station.

The village is just north of Limerick on the R464 road. It is on the left bank of the River Shannon near the suburb of Corbally.

Kilquane Graveyard is situated around the site of the church ruin in the parish of St. Patrick’s in Parteen. It is located in the back of the Shannon Banks Estate in Corbally and is on the Clare bank of the river Shannon.

The village has a pitch and putt course and is home to Parteen-St. Nicholas GAA club.

See also
 List of towns and villages in Ireland

References

External links

Towns and villages in County Clare